The 2022 Idaho Attorney General election took place on November 8, 2022, to elect the next attorney general of Idaho. Incumbent Republican Attorney General Lawrence Wasden sought a sixth term in office, but was defeated in the Republican primary on May 17.

Republican primary

Candidates

Nominated 
Raúl Labrador, U.S. Representative for Idaho's 1st congressional district (2011–2019) and candidate for Governor in 2018

Eliminated in primary 
Lawrence Wasden, incumbent attorney general
Arthur Macomber, attorney

Failed to file 
Dennis Boyles, attorney

Endorsements

Polling

Results

Democratic primary

Candidates

Replacement nominee 
Tom Arkoosh, attorney

Withdrew after nomination 
Steven Scanlin, attorney

Results

On July 18, Scanlin withdrew from the race. Boise attorney Tom Arkoosh took his place on the general election ballot for November.

General election

Predictions

Endorsements

See also
Idaho Attorney General

Notes

Partisan clients

References

External links
Official campaign websites
Raúl Labrador (R) for Attorney General
Tom Arkoosh (D) for Attorney General

Attorney General
Idaho
Idaho Attorney General elections